The Battle of Timbuktu occurred in Timbuktu, Mali, in March 2013, between Islamist groups and Mali government forces supported by France.

On the night of 20–21 March, a group of Islamist militants tried to infiltrate the airport. A car with armed men also tried to break into the city; however, French and Malian forces pushed them back.

Attack
The city of Timbuktu was guarded by the Malian army while about 150 French soldiers guarded the airport. Then, about 50 to 100 Islamists launched an attack from Bamba, west of Bourem, at March 20 at 10:19 pm. A suicide car bomber exploded himself on a road south of the Timbuktu airport. Camouflaged in the colors of the Malian army, the vehicle arrived near a checkpoint held by Malian soldiers. The attack killed one and wounded another two Malians. Shortly after, some 30 jihadists crossed the Mouamar Gaddafi canal and attacked the airport from the east. The shooting lasted several hours before dying out in the evening. Meanwhile, Malian troops were coming out of Timbuktu to help the French, but they crossed another group of jihadists. Three Malians were wounded from friendly fire. The French then asked the Malians to retreat to avoid further fratricide. At 1 am, the French bombarded Jihadist positions, leading them to retreat. The jihadists returned to the offensive the next morning, but after an hour of fighting, and after two failed suicide attacks, they retreated. The attack was later claimed by MOJAO, but the French claimed that AQIM  participated as well. Eight Malians were wounded and one killed, with the French giving estimates of 5 to 11 Jihadist killed.

See also 
 Second Battle of Timbuktu

References 

Conflicts in 2013
2013 in Mali
Battle
Battles involving France
Mali War
March 2013 events in Africa
Battles in 2013